The 51st Academy Awards ceremony, organized by the Academy of Motion Picture Arts and Sciences (AMPAS), honored films released in 1978 and took place on April 9, 1979, at the Dorothy Chandler Pavilion in Los Angeles beginning at 7:00 p.m. PST / 10:00 p.m. EST. During the ceremony, AMPAS presented Academy Awards (commonly referred to as Oscars) in 23 categories. The ceremony, televised in the United States by ABC, was produced by Jack Haley Jr. and directed by Marty Pasetta. Comedian and talk show host Johnny Carson hosted the show for the first time. Three days earlier in a ceremony held at The Beverly Hilton in Beverly Hills, California, the Academy Awards for Technical Achievement were presented by hosts Gregory Peck and Christopher Reeve.

The Deer Hunter won five awards at the main awards ceremony, including Best Picture. Other winners included Coming Home with three awards, Midnight Express with two, and The Buddy Holly Story, California Suite, Days of Heaven, Death on the Nile, The Flight of the Gossamer Condor, Get Out Your Handkerchiefs, Heaven Can Wait, Scared Straight!, Special Delivery, Superman, Teenage Father, and Thank God It's Friday with one. The telecast was watched by 46.3 million viewers and earned a 34.6 Nielsen rating in the United States.

Ceremony
The ceremony, held at the Dorothy Chandler Pavilion in Downtown Los Angeles, was hosted by late-night talk host Johnny Carson for the first time. Jack Elliott and Allyn Ferguson served as musical directors for the telecast. Singers Sammy Davis Jr. and Steve Lawrence performed a medley called "Oscar's Only Human" which was composed of movie songs that were not nominated for Best Original Song. Initially the academy's music branch protested the segment and urged that it be dropped from the ceremony, but it was kept after Haley threatened to leave his position as producer and pull Carson from emcee duties.

It is also remembered for being the final public appearance of Oscar-winning actor John Wayne, where he was given a standing ovation before presenting the award for Best Picture. On June 11, two months after the ceremony, he died from complications from stomach cancer at age 72.  This was also the final public appearance for Jack Haley, the father of producer Jack Haley Jr., who presented the Best Costume Design with his Wizard of Oz co-star Ray Bolger.

Winners and nominees
The nominees for the 51st Academy Awards were announced on February 20, 1979, by Academy president Howard W. Koch and actress Susan Blakely. The Deer Hunter and Heaven Can Wait tied for the most nominations with nine each. The winners were announced during the awards ceremony on April 9. Best Director nominees Warren Beatty and Buck Henry became the second pair of directors nominated in that category for the same film; Jerome Robbins and Robert Wise had won for co-directing 1961's West Side Story. Furthermore, Beatty was the first person to earn acting, directing, producing, and screenwriting nominations for the same film. While Orson Welles had previously achieved the same feat for Citizen Kane, rules at the time determined that the studio releasing the film, as opposed to the individual producers, were the official nominees for Best Picture. With Jon Voight and Jane Fonda's respective wins in the Best Actor and Best Actress categories, Coming Home was the fourth film to win both lead acting awards. Best Supporting Actress winner Maggie Smith became the only person to win an Oscar for playing an Oscar loser in California Suite.

Awards

Winners are listed first, highlighted in boldface and indicated with a double dagger.

Academy Honorary Awards
 Laurence Olivier  For a remarkable career and body of work entertaining audiences through the medium of film.
 Walter Lantz  For creating memorable characters in animation including Woody Woodpecker.
 King Vidor  For his distinctive achievements and innovations to direction in cinema.
 Museum of Modern Art Department of Film  In recognition of educating and inspiring the public regarding the artistic value of cinema.

Jean Hersholt Humanitarian Award
The award recognizes individuals whose humanitarian efforts have brought credit to the motion picture industry.
 Leo Jaffe

Special Achievement Award
 Les Bowie, Colin Chilvers, Denys Coop, Roy Field, Derek Meddings and Zoran Perisic for the visual effects of Superman.

Multiple nominations and awards

The following fourteen films had multiple nominations:

The following three films received multiple awards.

Presenters and performers
The following individuals, listed in order of appearance, presented awards or performed musical numbers:

Presenters

Performers

See also
 List of submissions to the 51st Academy Awards for Best Foreign Language Film

References

Bibliography

External links
Official websites
 
 
 Oscars channel at YouTube (run by the Academy of Motion Picture Arts and Sciences)

Analysis
 1978 Academy Awards Winners and History Filmsite
 Academy Awards, USA: 1979 Internet Movie Database

Other resources
 

Academy Awards ceremonies
1978 film awards
1979 in Los Angeles
1979 in American cinema
April 1979 events in the United States
Academy
Television shows directed by Marty Pasetta